The VTB United League Most Valuable Player award is an annual award that is given to the most valuable player of the Northeast European regional VTB United League, which is the 1st-tier professional basketball league of Russia. The award has been given since the 2009–10 VTB United League season.

Winners

Notes:
 E.J. Rowland owns American nationality as well, as he was a naturalized player of Bulgaria.
 There was no awarding in the 2019–20, because the season was cancelled due to the coronavirus pandemic in Europe.

Awards won by nationality

Awards won by club

References

External links
 VTB United League Official Website 
 VTB United League Official Website 

VTB United League awards
Basketball most valuable player awards